Chalybeothemis chini is a species of dragonflies in the family Libellulidae.  It is named after the type locality - Tasek Chini (state of Pahang in Peninsular Malaysia). This species has so far been recorded at two sites - Tasek Chini and Kuala Tahan (both in the state of Pahang).

References

Libellulidae
Insects described in 2007